D.A.V. Public School  is a school in Wadi, Kalaburagi, Karnataka, India, affiliated with the Central Board of Secondary Education.

References

Schools in Kalaburagi district
Schools affiliated with the Arya Samaj